Colonel Francis Clere Hitchcock MC (1896 - 1962)  wrote Stand To—A Diary of the Trenches 1915-1918 about the activities of the second Leinster Regiment of the British Army in World War I.

Biography
He was born in Dublin and spent most of his young life in Kinnitty, Birr, County Offaly where his father was the Church of Ireland parish rector. His brother was the Hollywood director Rex Ingram.

He enlisted as an officer in the Leinster Regiment at the start of World War I, and fought in France where he was awarded the Military Cross. He remained in the British Army until retirement with the rank of Colonel.

References

Bibliography
 
 

People from County Offaly
Prince of Wales's Leinster Regiment officers
British Army personnel of World War I
Recipients of the Military Cross
Irish writers
Place of death missing
1896 births
1962 deaths